The following is a list of governors of Venezuela Province, one of the Provinces of the Spanish Empire.

List of governors

 
 
Venezuela Province